Sailing at the 2011 Island Games was held from 25 June–1 July 2011 at the Yaverland Sailing Club & Sandown Bay.

Events

Medal table

Medal summary

References
Sailing at the 2011 Island Games

2011 Island Games
2011 in sailing
2011
Sailing competitions in the United Kingdom